Klepikovskaya is a rural locality (a village) in Ramenskoye Rural Settlement, Syamzhensky District, Vologda Oblast, Russia. The population was 26 as of 2002.

Geography 
Klepikovskaya is located 38 km north of Syamzha (the district's administrative centre) by road. Lodyzhenskaya is the nearest rural locality.

Attractions 
There are no attractions in Klepikovskaya according to Google Maps.

References 

Rural localities in Syamzhensky District